John and Isabel Burnham House, also known as the Pagoda House, is a historic home located at Long Beach, LaPorte County, Indiana.  It was designed by architect John Lloyd Wright and built in 1934.  It is a five level house located on the shore of Lake Michigan.  The house is a blend of Prairie School and International Style architecture with hipped and pent roof forms. The house is sheathed in stucco and salmon colored brick. Also contributing is the house site with extensive stone terracing.

It was listed on the National Register of Historic Places in 2013.

References

Houses on the National Register of Historic Places in Indiana
Prairie School architecture in Indiana
International style architecture in Indiana
Houses completed in 1934
Houses in LaPorte County, Indiana
National Register of Historic Places in LaPorte County, Indiana
1934 establishments in Indiana